Nathan Mason (born 8 September 1993) is an English rugby league footballer who plays as a  for the Huddersfield Giants in the Betfred Super League.

He previously played for the Huddersfield Giants in the Super League, and on loan from Huddersfield at Oldham (Heritage № 1325) in the Championship and League 1, and the Batley Bulldogs and Leigh in the Championship. Mason also played for the London Broncos in the Super League, and spent time on loan from the Broncos at the Sheffield Eagles in the second tier.

Background
Mason was born in Oldham, Greater Manchester, England.

Career
In October 2017 he joined the Leigh Centurions on a one-year loan deal.

In 2019 he helped the Eagles to win the inaugural 1895 Cup as they defeated the Widnes Vikings 36–18 in the final.

References

External links
Leigh Centurions profile
London Broncos profile
Leigh profile
Huddersfield Giants profile
SL profile

1993 births
Living people
Batley Bulldogs players
English rugby league players
Halifax R.L.F.C. players
Huddersfield Giants players
Leigh Leopards players
London Broncos players
Oldham R.L.F.C. players
Rugby league props
Sheffield Eagles players
Rugby league players from Oldham